Milton Valenzuela (born 13 August 1998) is an Argentine professional footballer who plays as a defender for Swiss club Lugano.

Club career

Newell's Old Boys 
Valenzuela is a youth exponent from Newell's Old Boys, having joined the club at the age of 14. He broke into the first team at the age of 17, making his league debut on 6 February 2016 against San Martín de San Juan in a 2–1 away defeat in Rosario. While never becoming a permanent feature with the first team after his break through, Valenzuela made 13 league appearances for the club, along with 3 cup appearances, over three seasons.

Because of his youth and lack of playing time, on January 26, 2018, Valenzuela was sent on a year long loan to Columbus Crew SC of Major League Soccer, with an option to buy at the end of the loan. After a successful season with Columbus in MLS, the Crew exercised their purchase option at the end of the 2018 season and Valenzuela ended his time with his boyhood club.

Columbus Crew 
Valenzuela made his debut for Columbus on 3 March 2018, playing 90 minutes in a 2–0 win against Toronto FC. He scored his first professional goal on 24 March 2018 in a 3–1 win against D.C. United. Over the course of the season he made 30 appearances with 29 starts. Valenzuela was an immediate success for Columbus, and over the course of the season, became one of the league's top attacking defenders. Valenzuela completed 27 crosses from the run of play, first among defenders in the league, and was among the best tacklers in the league winning 57 out of 87. Moreover, the defender also scored one goal and produced six assists.

On 21 December 2018, it was announced that Valenzuela's immensely successful first season in Columbus had caused the team to exercise their purchase option signing Valenzuela permanently ahead of their 2019 season. However, despite an encouraging preseason, Valenzuela suffered a tear in his ACL during training and would be out for the entirety of the 2019 season.

Valenzuela returned from injury for Columbus during the 2020 season. He made a total of 24 appearances and was part of the team that won the 2020 MLS Cup.

During the 2021 season, Valenzuela played in only 14 of the Crew's 34 regular season games, dealing with hamstring issues throughout the majority of the year. On April 28th, Valenzuela scored his only goal of the season against Monterrey in the 2021 CONCACAF Champions League quarterfinal.

Lugano
On 30 January 2022, Valenzuela signed a contract with Lugano in Switzerland until 30 June 2025.

Personal life 
Before moving to Columbus, Ohio, Valenzuela lived with his entire family in Argentina. He admitted that there was a learning curve that comes with moving from Argentina to the United States, while also living by himself for the first time. However, he believes that these experiences will help him become a better person and a stronger footballer.

Career statistics

Honours 
Columbus Crew
 MLS Cup (1): 2020
 Campeones Cup: 2021

Lugano
Swiss Cup: 2021–22

References

1997 births
Living people
Association football forwards
Argentine footballers
Argentina under-20 international footballers
Newell's Old Boys footballers
Columbus Crew players
FC Lugano players
Argentine Primera División players
Designated Players (MLS)
Major League Soccer players
Argentine expatriate footballers
Expatriate soccer players in the United States
Argentine expatriate sportspeople in the United States
Expatriate footballers in Switzerland
Argentine expatriate sportspeople in Switzerland
Footballers from Rosario, Santa Fe